The King's Academy is a private college preparatory Christian school for preschool through 12th grade in Seymour, Tennessee. The academy is a day and boarding school, reaching local national and international students of all socioeconomic backgrounds. The school’s focus is educating and preparing them academically, emotionally, physically, socially, and spiritually for the 21st century.

References

External links

The Association of Boarding Schools profile

1880 establishments in Tennessee
Baptist schools in the United States
Boarding schools in Tennessee
Christian schools in Tennessee
Educational institutions established in 1880
Private K-12 schools in Tennessee
Schools in Sevier County, Tennessee